Geoffrey Mark Dent-Brocklehurst (25 April 1932 – 9 September 1972) was a British stockbroker and the heir to Sudeley Castle. He was the son of Major John Henry Dent-Brocklehurst and his wife, Mary (née Morrison). Via his paternal grandmother, Marion Lascelles, he is a descendant of Henry Lascelles, 3rd Earl of Harewood. Thus he was a third cousin of George Lascelles, 7th Earl of Harewood. Michael Hicks Beach, 2nd Earl St Aldwyn, whose mother was Marjorie Brocklehurst, was his first cousin.

Dent-Brocklehurst died suddenly from a heart attack in 1972, aged 40. The castle passed to his wife, Mary Elizabeth (née Chipps), and their two children, Henry and Mollie. His wife remarried Henry Cubitt, 4th Baron Ashcombe, in 1979.

Ancestry

References

External links
 (St Marys Chapel, Sudeley Castle)

1932 births
1972 deaths
20th-century British businesspeople